William Edward Blackburn (24 November 1888 – 3 June 1941) was an English amateur first-class cricketer, who played ten matches for the Yorkshire County Cricket Club between 1919 and 1920.

Born in Clitheroe, Lancashire, England, Blackburn was a right-handed batsman, who scored 26 runs with a highest score of six not out, at an average of 3.71. His right-arm fast medium bowling took 45 wickets at an average of 24.73, with a best return of five wickets for seventeen runs.

Blackburn died in June 1941 in Heaton, Bolton, Lancashire, aged 52.

References

External links
Cricinfo Profile

1888 births
1941 deaths
Yorkshire cricketers
People from Clitheroe
English cricketers